The Normand Dube Aerocruiser 450 Turbo is a six-seat Canadian amateur-built aircraft, designed by Normand Dube and produced by Aviation Normand Dube of Sainte-Anne-des-Plaines, Quebec. The aircraft is a development of the four-seat Norman Dube Aerocruiser Plus.

Design and development
The Aerocruiser 450 Turbo features a strut-braced high-wing, a six-seat enclosed cabin accessed by doors, fixed  conventional landing gear and a single engine in tractor configuration.

The aircraft is made with a welded 4130 steel tubing fuselage and a riveted 2024 aluminum wing. The engine used on the prototype is a  turbocharged, geared and fuel-injected Lycoming TIGO-541 four-stroke powerplant.

Operational history
Reviewers Roy Beisswenger and Marino Boric described the design in a 2015 review as "a two-ton giant".

By December 2018, one example, the prototype, had been registered with Transport Canada.

In December of 2014, the designer of the Aerocruiser 450 Turbo, Normand Dube, used his own aircraft to sabotage two of Hydro-Quebec's high-tension power lines, causing over 180,000 customers to lose electrical power. He was convicted for the attack in Quebec court in November 2018 and sentenced to seven years in prison for the attack. The aircraft used in the attack, the prototype Aerocruiser 450 Turbo, was seized as evidence.

Specifications (Aerocruiser 450 Turbo)

References

External links

Aerocruiser 450 Turbo
1990s Canadian sport aircraft
1990s Canadian civil utility aircraft
Single-engined tractor aircraft
High-wing aircraft
Homebuilt aircraft